"Tomtegubben som hade snuva", also known as "En liten tomtegubbe satt en gång", is a Swedish children's song from 1915, written by Felix Körling. The song depicts a little tomte suffering from rhinitis, but becoming healthy again after, advised by his wife, getting medicine by "Doktor Mullvad"/"(Doctor Mole)".

The song is often used as a Christmas song, even if the word Christmas isn't mentioned, and it's not made clear whether the main character is Santa Claus (or one of his elves) or the old traditional "tomte".

Publication
Lek med toner, 1971
Barnvisboken, 1977, as "En liten tomtegubbe" ("Tomtegubben som hade snuva")
Julens önskesångbok, 1997, under the heading "Nyare julsånger"

Recordings
An early recording was done by four-year-old girl Lisbeth Bodin with Cupolorkestern on 28 October 1949, and was released as a single in January 1950.

References

1915 songs
Swedish Christmas songs
Swedish children's songs
Swedish-language songs
Songs about fictional male characters
Songs about physicians
Music based on European myths and legends